Morewood is an unincorporated community and coal town in Westmoreland County, Pennsylvania, United States.  In early April, 1891, it was the site of the Morewood massacre, which left nine striking workers of the United Mine Workers shot to death.

References

Unincorporated communities in Westmoreland County, Pennsylvania
Coal towns in Pennsylvania
Unincorporated communities in Pennsylvania